Alan-e Olya (also Romanized as Ālān-e ‘Olyā, ‘Alān-e ‘Olyā, and Allān-e ‘Olyā; also known as Alānd Bāla and Ālān-e Bālā) is a village in Gol Tappeh Rural District, Gol Tappeh District, Kabudarahang County, Hamadan Province, Iran. At the 2006 census, its population was 300, in 55 families.

References 

Populated places in Kabudarahang County